The 1999 Basingstoke and Deane Council election took place on 6 May 1999 to elect members of Basingstoke and Deane Borough Council in Hampshire, England. One third of the council was up for election and the council stayed under no overall control.

After the election, the composition of the council was
Conservative 24
Labour 15
Liberal Democrats 14
Independent 3
Others 1

Election result

References

1999
1999 English local elections
1990s in Hampshire